Actinopolyspora halophila is a bacterium. It differs from its cogenerate bacteria in the make-up of its cell wall.  Like all Actinopolyspora, A. halophila requires saline conditions for survival, however wild types generally require more than 12% salt concentration to grow, and can grow in concentrations of up to 30%.

References

Further reading

Nyyssölä, Antti. Pathways of glycine betaine synthesis in two extremely halophilic bacteria, Actinopolyspora halophila and Ectothiorhodospira halochloris. Helsinki University of Technology, 2001.

External links

LPSN
Type strain of Actinopolyspora halophila at BacDive -  the Bacterial Diversity Metadatabase

Actinomycetia
Bacteria described in 1975